Jack Rocchi (21 December 1904 – 25 November 1979) was an Australian rules footballer who played for South Fremantle in the WAFL and Fitzroy in the VFL.

Originally from the Goldfields, Rocchi started his career at South Fremantle and became their first ever Sandover Medal winner in 1928. A dual best and fairest winner at South Fremantle, he was recruited to Fitzroy after impressing during an interstate appearance for West Australia against Victoria. It took a while for him to get a clearance and he made his Fitzroy debut in 1931. An injury however restricted him to just four games that season.

Rocchi later served in the Royal Australian Air Force during World War II.

References

1904 births
1979 deaths
Fitzroy Football Club players
South Fremantle Football Club players
Sandover Medal winners
Boulder City Football Club players
Australian rules footballers from Western Australia
People from Boulder, Western Australia